The Taita people (the Wataita or Wadawida) are a Kenyan ethnic group located in the Taita-Taveta County. They speak Kidawida or Kitaita which belongs to the Bantu languages. The West-Bantu moved to the area of the Taita-Taveta County first approximately in 1000-1300.

It has been argued that the Taita people migrated to Kenya through Tanzania. They migrated to Kenya in five groups each settling at different places in the present Taita-Taveta District in Kenya. While settling in these areas the Taita-speaking people interacted with other communities or tribes particularly the Taveta, the Pare of Tanzania, and the Maasai. Contrary to this argument, the inhabitants reveal migration occurred back and forth throughout the history of these groups, and the Taita people should be viewed as a part of the bigger population inhabiting the entire Kilimanjaro Corridor.

There are subgroups or subtribes of Taita. They can be divided into Wadawida who traditionally lived around the Dawida, the Wasagalla who lived around the Saghalla and the Wakasighau who lived around the Kasighau massif of the Taita Hills. The Saghalla people speak Kisaghala which is much closer to Kigiriama or Mijikenda (nine tribes who speak almost same language). The Kasighau are more closer to the Pare and Chagga of Tanzania but are a Taita-speaking people.

Traditionally the Taita tribe consisted of lineages/clans (vichuku; singular kichuku). Each lineage occupied its own territorial area of the hills. These lineages were autonomous political units and before colonialism there did not develop an idea or a consciousness of a unified Taita tribe.

While some cultural traits among the Saghalla, Kasighau and Dawida were shared, like the skull "burials" in caves and rock shelters, there were small variations among the Dawida and the Saghalla. While the Dawida only kept the skulls of old men above seventy years, the Saghala kept women and children skulls as well as the men. In some parts of Saghala they had places where they kept skulls of any other communities that died in their territory.

There were also other traditions such as the secret cult of the Wabasi. While the origin of this tradition is not very much known it thrived in Taita. The Wabasi were a feared group of people (cult) in Taita. Anybody who joined the Wabasi cult can not be buried by a non-Abasi (singular). They had their sacred forests and meeting places.

Mwangeka, a legendary figure for the Taitas, resisted the British colonists from approaching the lands of the Wataita.

Language 
Today the language of the Taita (Kidawida, Kitaita) is an enriched language full of shared words from Chagga, Pare, Maasai, Mijikenda and the other communities they lived with.

The Taita people have several dialects. The Mbololo Taita have their own, Bura Taita have another. Wusi, Kidaya, Mghange, Chawia, Mwanda, Kishamba, Werugha, Wumingu, Wundanyi—these are the so-called Dawidas. Kisaghalla and the Kasighau are rather independent dialects and when visiting the other Taita Massifs they would say "we are going to Dawida."

Religion
Half Of the population Are of the Islamic Religion Mostly Towards the east of the county, from Mbololo heading towards the Island Of Mombasa where most people are Muslims. Since the coming of the Omani arabs In Mombasa and later to Zanzibar, the people of Taita were assimilated to Islam From the influence of their Neighbours of the coast.Islam established its presence on the Southeast African coast from around the 9th century, when Bantu traders settling on the coast tapped into the Indian Ocean trade networks. The Taita people follow the Sunni denomination of Islam.

But before that, the spectacular Taita Hills were the focus for religious activity and there are huge Rocks (Magamba), and caves known as 'Mbanga' that were considered very sacred places for the dead and for worship. In earlier times the caves also offered security and a places of shelter.   At the caves the skulls of the dead were arranged according to clans or lineages. The caves also acted also as isolation wards for dreaded diseases and infected patients. The sick would be isolated and confined to the caves and food provided to them at the caves. If a patient survived he or she would be allowed to rejoin the community. Some forests also were important sacred places and people were prohibited from carrying any other activities in turn also helping a great deal in conservation. The sacred forests are known as Fighi and they are the equivalent of the Mijikenda's Kaya.

The hills and rocks on the other extreme served as grounds for discipline and instilling fear; criminals were taken up the rocks and thrown down to their death. In the caves also lived some of the largest poisonous snakes and other dangerous creatures.

In conclusion, Most of the people of the Taita are mostly muslims with a few Christians towards the western side of the county.

Marriage

Most of the Taita families practiced polygamy. 
Normally, marriages were pre-arranged where the groom was a family friend to the bride's family. Dowry, in form of livestock, would be paid over time, the decisions made by the bride's father and uncles (from the mother's side) were highly regarded during the negotiations (Wupe).
When the girls were perceived old enough for marriage, they would be 'kidnapped' by their would be in-laws and this happened in the evenings when they went out to fetch water or firewood.

References

 
Bantu people
Indigenous peoples of East Africa